Wolf Lake Airport  is a privately owned, publicly used airport located in Palmer, Alaska. The airport is located between Palmer and Wasilla.

The airport was founded in 1982 by Maurice Wilson. The current owner, Barb Doty, took over the airport in 1997 with John Eshleman. The airport is managed by D. E. NorthFork LLC.

Wolf Lake airport has two runways: one is paved, with a length of 3,800 feet, and the second, gravel cross runway is 2,600 feet in length.

Wolf Lake Airport is a mixed-use community, with both residential and commercial-aviation operators.

References

1982 establishments in Alaska
Airports in Matanuska-Susitna Borough, Alaska